Charles Martin "Marty" Amsler (born October 26, 1942) is a former American football defensive end in the National Football League for the Chicago Bears, Cincinnati Bengals and Green Bay Packers. He played college football at the University of Evansville.

Early years
Amsler went to Benjamin Bosse High School in Evansville, Indiana and graduated in 1960. He graduated from University of Evansville in 1967.

In 1964, he was named to the All-Conference team of the Indiana Collegiate Conference at defensive end.

He was inducted into the University of Evansville Hall of Fame and the Indiana Football Hall of Fame in 1979 and 2001 respectively.

Professional career

Dallas Cowboys
Amsler was selected in the 18th round (243rd overall) of the 1965 NFL Draft by the Dallas Cowboys. He became the first graduate from the University of Evansville to be drafted into the NFL. He was waived before the season started and returned to Evansville, to serve as an assistant coach for the offensive and defensive linemen.

Denver Broncos (first stint)
He signed with the Denver Broncos as a free agent in 1966, but was cut before the season started.

Wheeling Ironmen
In 1966, he played defensive end for the Wheeling Ironmen of the Continental Football League.

Chicago Bears
Amsler signed as a free agent with the Chicago Bears in 1967 and played in fourteen games that season,  registering one interception and one fumble recovered. He missed the 1968 season with a torn Achilles tendon. The next year, he played in eleven games and recorded one fumble recovery. He was released on September 14, 1970.

Cincinnati Bengals
He was claimed off waivers by the Cincinnati Bengals on September 15, 1970 and played three games before being cut.

Green Bay Packers
The Green Bay Packers signed Amsler to their taxi squad on October 18, 1970, before activating him in week six and playing him the rest of the season (9 games). He also played on special teams.

Denver Broncos (second stint)
He signed with the Denver Broncos as a free agent in 1971, but was released on September 2. Throughout his entire NFL career he played in 37 games and started in 20.

Personal life
Amsler was a member of the NFL Players Association Former Players Board of Directors. He lived in Evansville, Indiana and Mount Prospect, Illinois. While living in Mount Prospect, he was named to the board of directors for the satellite branch of the Franklin Boulevard Community Hospital proposed for just south of Wheeling.  He has a son named C. Martin Amsler III.

References

1942 births
Living people
Sportspeople from Evansville, Indiana
Players of American football from Indiana
American football defensive ends
Evansville Purple Aces football players
Chicago Bears players
Cincinnati Bengals players
Green Bay Packers players